In the 2009–10 season, the Serie B competition of rugby union in Italy consisted of four groups each of 12 teams, with a playoff for promotion among the top two teams from each group. The competition resulted in the promotion of four teams to Serie A2: Modena, Reggio Emilia, Roccia (Rubano) and Valpolicella.

Results

Group A

Matchday 1

Matchday 2

Matchday 3

Matchday 4

Matchday 5

Matchday 6

Matchday 7

Matchday 8

Matchday 9

Matchday 10

Matchday 11

Matchday 12

Matchday 13

Matchday 14

Matchday 15

Matchday 16

Matchday 17

Matchday 18

Matchday 19

Matchday 20

Matchday 21

Matchday 22

2009–10 in Italian rugby union
Serie B